Goolman is a rural locality in the City of Ipswich, Queensland, Australia.

Geography 
The east of Goolman contains the northern foothills of the Flinders Peak Group.  The slopes remain vegetated with little development occurring in the area.

Ipswich – Boonah Road (State Route 93) runs along part of the western boundary.

History
The locality name Goolman comes from nearby Mount Goolman, which in turn derives its name from stone axe in the Yuggera language.

Residents in the Fassifern Valley petitioned the Queensland Government to build a railway line to their district, and the first section of the Dugandan railway line was opened on 10 July 1882 as far as Harrisville. This is considered to be Queensland's first branch railway. Goolman was served by the Goolman railway station on the Ipswich Boonah Road. The branch was extended to Dugandan on 12 September 1887. The line closed in 1964.

Attractions
The Flinders - Goolman Conservation Estate covers 1,900 hectares and includes several peaks including Flinders Peak, Mount Goolman, Mount Blain and Mount Cathrine.  Hardings Paddocks Picnic Area is located in Goolman.  It includes horse riding facilities, walking tracks and a camping area.

References

External links

City of Ipswich
Localities in Queensland